The Interurban Trail are a pair of trails in Washington. The interurban Trail North is a bicycle route running from Downtown Seattle through Shoreline and to the Snohomish County, Washington line. The Interurban Trail South is a rail trail in King and Pierce counties.

Interurban Trail North
The Interurban Trail North begins as a signed bicycle route in downtown Seattle running through the Fremont neighborhood, through Phinney Ridge and Greenwood, to 110th and Fremont where it becomes a paved rail trail until 128th and Linden where it will become a cycletrack to the City of Shoreline border. At the City of Shoreline the route becomes a wide non-motorized route for 3 miles until the Snohomish County line.

Interurban Trail South
The Interurban Trail South is a partially paved  recreational trail open for non-motorized use. It connects Tukwila to Pacific, and the towns of Kent, Auburn, and Algona along the way. , the cities of Edgewood and Milton completed and opened paved segments of the Interurban trail but were not yet connected to the main segment from Tukwila to Pacific. Additionally, the City of Fife has a short segment now under construction. When the construction is completed to close the gaps in Pacific, Edgewood, and Milton, the trail will extend from Tukwila to Fife.

The trail occupies an abandoned Puget Sound Electric Railway corridor and connects to the Green River Trail.

In addition to the main line of the Interurban trail between Tukwila and Fife the Interurban Trail South will connect to the planned northerly extension of the Foothills Trail through Puyallup and Sumner. When that connection is completed, a continuous trail will extend south through Pacific, across the county line into Sumner and Puyallup where it will connect with the existing Pierce County Foothills Trail to South Prairie and the planned extension of the Foothills trail to Buckley and Enumclaw.

References

External links

 Interurban Trail (South) at KingCounty.gov
King County Bicycling Guidemap - Southern Section (10 MB PDF)

Rail trails in Washington (state)
Transportation in King County, Washington
Parks in Kent, Washington